The Belmont Bruins men's soccer team represents Belmont University in NCAA Division I soccer. The Bruins currently play in the Missouri Valley Conference (MVC). From 2018 to 2021 the Bruins played in the Southern Conference (SoCon), and prior to that played in the Horizon League. The Bruins play their home matches at the soccer stadium in the sports complex located at the city of Nashville's E. S. Rose Park. A former Division II All-American and long-time collegiate assistant coach, Bryan Green has been the Bruins' head coach since 2014.

Conference membership
Source=

Coaching history
Source=

Notable alumni 
 Jay Ayres
 J. P. Rodrigues

References

External links